Steven Cravis (born, Lexington, Massachusetts), is a pianist, composer and music producer based in San Francisco, California, who scores for television, film and ringtones as well as releasing new age music with a focus on meditation and relaxation.
His works include for the award-winning Quell (video game) app, Orisinal, Animal Planet, CBS, CNN, NBC, and Matchroom Sport|UK.

Cravis began taking piano lessons at the age of seven and studied piano performance at the Berklee College of Music in Boston.
He has released several albums of peace inspiring, solo piano work including True Reflections (1992), The Sound of Light (1995), Lavender Dreams (2004), Healing Piano (2009) and Cloudwalker (2016).

In 2017 he provided the score for the TV documentary Going the Distance: Journeys of Recovery, about survivors of traumatic brain injury.

References

External links
Orisinal
Trailer

People from Lexington, Massachusetts
Living people
American male pianists
21st-century American pianists
21st-century American male musicians
Year of birth missing (living people)